Richard Otis "Dick" Meredith (born December 22, 1932) is an American retired ice hockey player.

Career 
Meredith played college hockey at the University of Minnesota. He won a silver medal at the 1956 Winter Olympics and a gold medal at the 1960 Winter Olympics.

Awards and honors

References

 

1932 births
American men's ice hockey forwards
Ice hockey players from Indiana
Ice hockey players at the 1956 Winter Olympics
Ice hockey players at the 1960 Winter Olympics
Living people
Medalists at the 1956 Winter Olympics
Medalists at the 1960 Winter Olympics
Minneapolis Millers (IHL) players
Minnesota Golden Gophers men's ice hockey players
Olympic gold medalists for the United States in ice hockey
Olympic silver medalists for the United States in ice hockey
Sportspeople from South Bend, Indiana